Jaime Fillol Haggstrom (born 3 November 1976) is a Chilean former professional tennis player.

Fillol, the only son of famous Chilean tennis player Jaime Sr, was born in Santiago but spent his early childhood in Los Angeles. His mother, Mindy Haggstrom, is an American. He later returned to the United States and played collegiate tennis at Florida International University.

A left-handed doubles specialist, Fillol won eight ITF Futures titles, one ATP Challenger tournament and featured in the main draw of four ATP Tour events during his career, with his best doubles ranking of 159 reached in 2002.

In addition to his father, Fillol's uncle (Álvaro Fillol) and nephew (Nicolás Jarry) have also played Davis Cup for Chile. His brother-in-law is former Argentine player Martín Rodríguez.

Challenger/Futures titles

Doubles

References

External links
 
 

1976 births
Living people
Chilean male tennis players
FIU Panthers athletes
College men's tennis players in the United States
Chilean people of American descent
Tennis players from Santiago